"Find That" is the first single from Stone Crazy, a 1997 album by East Coast hip hop group The Beatnuts. It was released by Relativity Records in 1996 as a promo single and track on the label's compilation album, Relativity Urban Assault. The song is produced by The Beatnuts and features  braggadocios raps by Juju and Psycho Les. Its eerie, bass-heavy, xylophone-assisted beat is more minimalistic and less sample-reliant than most Beatnuts songs.

"Find That" failed to chart and was overshadowed by future singles off of Stone Crazy. The song is nonetheless featured on two Beatnuts hits compilations, World Famous Classics and Beatnuts Forever. A scratched remix can be found on Roc Raida's 2000 album Crossfaderz. The song was also featured briefly in the 2000 movie Blackmale, starring Bokeem Woodbine and Justin Pierce.

Single track list

A-Side
 "Find That (Clean Version)" (3:56)
 "Find That (Street Version)" (3:56)

B-Side
 "Find That (Instrumental Version)" (3:56)

Find That
Find That
1996 songs
Relativity Records singles